Eleven Sports UK & Ireland was a video streaming service that launched in August 2018. It was part of the Eleven Sports Group which is owned by Andrea Radrizzani.

History 

In May 2018, Eleven Sports secured a three-year deal to broadcast La Liga football matches in the UK and Ireland.  Two months later, they secured UK three-year deals to screen Serie A matches, the Eredivisie and the Chinese Super League and Sweden's Allsvenskan.

Eleven Sports launched in the UK & Ireland with rights to the 2018 U.S. PGA. Eleven then signed for coverage of six LPGA tour events. Eleven Sports is currently in discussions with traditional television platforms about the possibility of launching linear channels and/or providing access to the Eleven Sports app.

The network faced criticism for defying rules banning telecasts of any football match between 2:45 p.m. and 5:15 p.m on Saturday matchdays, by streaming selected La Liga and Serie A matches. On 17 October 2018 Eleven Sports stated that it would no longer do so, but argued that the rules were outdated and encouraged illegal streaming. Representatives of the two leagues have supported Eleven Sports' position.

In November 2018, Eleven partnered with STV Group for it to become its digital advertising sales partner. As part of the partnership, STV Player also gained rights to stream selected La Liga and Serie A matches from Eleven within Scotland.

Eleven had announced an acquisition of rights to UFC mixed martial arts beginning January 2019. However, after Eleven failed to meet required targets for distribution, the promotion invoked an exit clause and renewed with BT Sport instead. It was also reported that the broadcaster was attempting to renegotiate some of its rights contracts at lower costs in order to sustain its business.

In January 2019, Eleven Sports dropped its rights to Serie A and Eredivisie football, passing on the rights to Premier Sports. Premier Sports also won the rights to the Chinese Super League and Swedish Allsvenskan, leaving Eleven with exclusive La Liga, Segunda Division play-offs, Copa del Rey, and Supercopa rights until at least the end of the season. Later in 2019 Eleven Sports closed its UK broadcast operations.

Summary of past sports rights 2018-2019

Football

Club content 

 La Liga TV

Golf

See also 

Sports broadcasting
Eleven Sports Network
STV
BT Sport
Eurosport
Sky Sports
Sport TV

References

External links

Sports television channels in the United Kingdom
Internet television channels
Subscription video streaming services
Sports television channels in Ireland